In United States criminal law, probable cause is the standard by which police authorities have reason to obtain a warrant for the arrest of a suspected criminal or the issuing of a search warrant. There is no universally accepted definition or formulation for probable cause. One traditional definition, which comes from the U.S. Supreme Court's 1964 decision Beck v. Ohio, is when "whether at [the moment of arrest] the facts and circumstances within [an officer's] knowledge and of which they had reasonably trustworthy information [are] sufficient to warrant a prudent [person] in believing that [a suspect] had committed or was committing an offense."

It is also the standard by which grand juries issue criminal indictments. The principle behind the standard is to limit the power of authorities to perform random or abusive searches (unlawful search and seizure), and to promote lawful evidence gathering and procedural form during criminal arrest and prosecution. The standard also applies to personal or property searches.

The term comes from the Fourth Amendment of the United States Constitution:

Probable in this case may relate to statistical probability or to a general standard of common behavior and customs. The context of the word probable here is not exclusive to community standards, and could partially derive from its use in formal mathematical statistics as some have suggested; but cf. probō, Latin etymology.

In U.S. immigration proceedings, the “reason to believe” standard has been interpreted as equivalent to probable cause.

Probable cause should not be confused with reasonable suspicion, which is the required criteria to perform a Terry stop in the United States of America. The criteria for reasonable suspicion are less strict than those for probable cause.

Definition
A common definition is "a reasonable amount of suspicion, supported by circumstances sufficiently strong to justify a prudent and cautious person's belief that certain facts are probably true". Notable in this definition is a lack of requirement for public position or public authority of the individual making the recognition, allowing for use of the term by citizens and/or the general public.
One nonlegal definition of probable cause is, “(A) reasonable ground for supposing that a charge is well-founded” (Merriam-Webster, 2019).

In the context of warrants, the Oxford Companion to American Law defines probable cause as "information sufficient to warrant a prudent person's belief that the wanted individual had committed a crime (for an arrest warrant) or that evidence of a crime or contraband would be found in a search (for a search warrant)". "Probable cause" is a stronger standard of evidence than a reasonable suspicion, but weaker than what is required to secure a criminal conviction. Even hearsay can supply probable cause if it is from a reliable source or supported by other evidence, according to the Aguilar–Spinelli test.

In Brinegar v. United States, the U.S. Supreme Court defines probable cause as "where the facts and circumstances within the officers' knowledge, and of which they have reasonably trustworthy information, are sufficient in themselves to warrant a belief by a man of reasonable caution that a crime is being committed."

History and development

The use of probable cause in the United States and its integration in the Fourth Amendment has roots in English common law and the old saying that "a man's home is his castle". This is the idea that someone has the right to defend their "castle" or home from unwanted "attacks" or intrusion. In the 1600s, this saying started to apply legally to landowners to protect them from casual searches from government officials.

In the 1700s, the British use of the writs of assistance and general warrants, which allowed authorities to search wherever and whenever sometimes, without expiration date, in the American colonies were raised in several court cases. The first was in Massachusetts in 1761 when a customs agent submitted for a new writ of assistance and Boston merchants challenged its legality. In the case the lawyer for the merchants James Otis argued that writs of assistance violated the fundamentals of English Law and was unconstitutional. John Adams, a lawyer at the time who later wrote the Massachusetts provision on which the Fourth Amendment heavily relied, was impacted by James Otis's argument

A case against general warrants was the English case Entick v. Carrington (1765). In that case, Lord Camden the chief judge said that general warrants were not the same as specific warrants and that parliament or case law could not authorize general warrants. Along with these statements, Lord Camden also affirmed that the needs of the state were more important than the individual's rights. This upheld the ideology of the social contract while holding to idea that the government purpose was to protect the property of the people. He called for the government to seek reasonable means in order to search private property, as well as a cause.

Probationers and parolees
In early cases in the United States, the Supreme Court held that when a person is on probation, the standard required for a search to be lawful is lowered from "probable cause" to "reasonable grounds" or "reasonable suspicion". Specifically, the degree of individualized suspicion required of a search was a determination of when there is a sufficiently high probability that criminal conduct is occurring to make the intrusion on the individual's privacy interest reasonable. The Supreme Court held in United States v. Knights:

Later, in Samson v. California, the Supreme Court ruled that reasonable suspicion is not even necessary:

The court held that reasonableness, not individualized suspicion, is the touchstone of the Fourth Amendment. It has been proposed that Fourth Amendment rights be extended to probationers and parolees, but such proposals have not gained traction. There is not much that remains of the Fourth Amendment rights of probationers after waiving their right to be free from unreasonable searches and seizures. An essay called "They Released Me from My Cage...But They Still Keep Me Handcuffed" was written in response to the Samson decision.

It has been argued that the requirement that a police officer must have individualized suspicion before searching a parolee's person and home was long considered a foundational element of the Court's analysis of Fourth Amendment questions and that abandoning it in the name of crime prevention represents an unprecedented blow to individual liberties.

Use of trained drug dogs

In the United States, use of a trained dog to smell for narcotics has been ruled in several court cases as sufficient probable cause. A K-9 Sniff in a public area is not a search according to the Supreme Court's ruling in 1983 United States v. Place. In this particular case, Place was in the New York Airport, and DEA agents took his luggage, even though he refused to have his bag searched. His luggage smelled of drugs, and the trained dog alerted the agents to this. Dogs alerting their officers provides enough probable cause for the officer to obtain a warrant. The DEA then procured a warrant and found a sizable amount of drugs in Place's luggage. It was not considered a search until after the warrant because a trained dog can sniff out the smell of narcotics, without having to open and look through the luggage. However, In Florida v. Jardines the court ruled that a police officer and narcotic-sniffing dog entering the porch of a home constitutes a search  which invokes the requirement of probable cause or a valid search warrant

The power of probable cause by K-9 units smelling for drugs is not limited to just airports, but even in schools, public parking lots, high crime neighborhood streets, mail, visitors in prisons, traffic stops, etc. If there is an incident where the dog alerts its officer, the probable cause from the dog is considered enough to conduct a search, as long as one of the exceptions to a warrant are present, such as incident to arrest, automobile, exigency, or with a stop and frisk. During a traffic stop and checkpoint, it is legal for police to allow a drug dog to sniff the exterior of the car. This is legal as long as it does not cause the traffic stop to be any longer than it would have been without the dog. If the dog finds a scent, it is again a substitute for probable cause.

Cyber surveillance
Under the 2001 USA Patriot Act, law enforcement officials did not need probable cause to access communications records, credit cards, bank numbers and stored emails held by third parties. They only need reasonable suspicion that the information they were accessing was part of criminal activities. Under this, officers were authorized for a court order to access the communication information. Only certain information could be accessed under this act (such as names, addresses, and phone numbers, etc.). Probable cause was, and is, needed for more detailed information because law enforcement needs a warrant to access additional information. Generally, law enforcement was not required to notify the suspect. However, the text of the Patriot Act limits the application of that statute to issues that clearly involve the national security of the United States. The U.S. patriot Act expired on June 1, 2015.

Consent to search

If voluntary consent is given and the individual giving the consent has authority over the search area, such as a car, house, business, etc. then a law enforcement officer does not need probable cause or even reasonable suspicion. If the person does not give voluntary consent, then the officer needs probable cause, and in some cases, a search warrant may be required to search the premises. Unless another exclusion to the fourth amendment of the US constitution occurs, when the person withdraws their consent for searching, the officer has to stop looking immediately.

Accident investigation
In the United States, the term probable cause is used in accident investigation to describe the conclusions reached by the investigating body as to the factor or factors which caused the accident. This is primarily seen in reports on aircraft accidents, but the term is used for the conclusion of diverse types of transportation accidents investigated in the United States by the National Transportation Safety Board or its predecessor, the Civil Aeronautics Board.

Related cases

In the United States
The Supreme Court decision Illinois v. Gates lowered the threshold of probable cause by ruling that a "substantial chance" or "fair probability" of criminal activity could establish probable cause. A better-than-even chance is not required.
The decision in Terry v. Ohio, established that "stop and frisks" (seizures) may be made under reasonable suspicion if the officer believes a crime has been committed, is, or soon will be committed with a weapon concealed on such person.
In United States v. Matlock, the Court announced the "co-occupant consent rule" which permitted one resident to consent in the co-occupant's absence. The case established that an officer who made a search with a reasonable belief that the search was consented to by a resident did not have to provide a probable cause for the search.
However, in Georgia v. Randolph, the Supreme Court ruled, thus replacing Matlock, when officers are presented with a situation wherein two parties, each having authority to grant consent to search premises they share, but one objects over the other's consent, the officers must adhere to the wishes of the non-consenting party.

New Jersey v. T. L. O., set a special precedent for searches of students at school. The Court ruled that school officials act as state officers when conducting searches, and do not require probable cause to search students' belongings, only reasonable suspicion. However, In Safford Unified School District v. Redding The court ruled that strip searches of students required probable cause or a search warrant.
In O'Connor v. Ortega, the Court relied on T.L.O. to extend the reasonable suspicion standard to administrative searches of public employees' belongings or workplaces when conducted by supervisors seeking evidence of violations of workplace rules rather than criminal offenses.

Probable cause hearings 

In the various states, a probable cause hearing is the preliminary hearing typically taking place before arraignment and before a serious crime goes to trial. The judge is presented with the basis of the prosecution's case, and the defendant is afforded full right of cross-examination and the right to be represented by legal counsel. If the prosecution cannot make a case of probable cause, the court must dismiss the case against the accused.

Comparison with other countries

Sweden
In the criminal code of some European countries, notably Sweden, probable cause is a higher level of suspicion than "justifiable grounds" in a two level system of formal suspicion. The latter refers only to the suspect being able to and sometimes having a motive to commit the crime and in some cases witness accounts, whereas probable cause generally requires a higher degree of physical evidence and allows for longer periods of detention before trial. See häktning.

United Kingdom

England and Wales
Powers of arrest without a warrant can be exercised by a constable who 'has reasonable grounds' to suspect that an individual is "about to commit an offence", or is "committing an offence"; in accordance with the Serious Organised Crime and Police Act 2005 and the partially repealed Police and Criminal Evidence Act 1984. The concept of "reasonable grounds for suspecting" is used throughout the law dealing with police powers.

Scotland
In Scotland, the legal language that provides the police with powers pertaining to stopping, arresting and searching a person – who "has committed or is committing an offence", or is in possession of an offensive article, or an article used in connection with an offence – is similar to that England and Wales. The powers are provided by the Criminal Procedure (Scotland) Act 1995 and the Police, Public Order and Criminal Justice (Scotland) Act 2005.

See also
 Civil rights
 Consent search
 Moral certainty
 Reasonable suspicion
 Preponderance of evidence
 Reasonable doubt
 Rights
 Terry stop
 Warrantless searches in the United States

References

External links
Legal information about probable cause
The Lawful Arrest FAQ entry on probable cause 12 3
Further information from Flexyourrights.org
Congressional Research Service

Criminal law
Causality
Legal reasoning